The Meltdown with Jonah and Kumail is a stand-up comedy television series that aired on Comedy Central in the United States. It was hosted by stand up comedians Jonah Ray and Kumail Nanjiani. It was filmed in the Nerdist Showroom at Meltdown Comics in Los Angeles. It originated as a weekly live show in 2010, and then on July 24, 2014, an edited version began airing on Comedy Central in eight-episode seasons.

On February 17, 2015, Comedy Central announced that it had picked up The Meltdown for a second season. On November 20, it was renewed for a third season. On September 23, 2016, it was announced that the third season would be the last, due to Ray and Nanjiani ending the live show.

Episodes

Series overview

Season 1 (2014)

Season 2 (2015)

Season 3 (2016)

References

Comedy Central original programming
2010s American late-night television series
2010s American stand-up comedy television series
2014 American television series debuts
2016 American television series endings
Comedy Central late-night programming
English-language television shows
Television series by Red Hour Productions